"Don't Matter to Me" is a song by Canadian musician Drake featuring posthumous vocals from American singer-songwriter Michael Jackson, from Drake's fifth studio album Scorpion (2018). It was playlisted by BBC Radio 1 on July 6, 2018. The song was set to be released to US rhythmic radio on July 10, 2018 alongside "In My Feelings". However, its release in the country was cancelled when Republic Records decided to solely push "In My Feelings" to rhythmic and contemporary hit radio stations in the US. Commercially, the song has reached No. 1 in Sweden as well as the top 10 in Australia, Canada, the Czech Republic, Ireland, the Netherlands, New Zealand, Norway, Portugal, Slovakia, Switzerland, the United Kingdom, and the United States.

Jackson's vocals were taken from part of an unreleased 1980 session between Jackson and Canadian singer-songwriter Paul Anka. The songs "Love Never Felt So Good" and "This Is It" (a.k.a. "I Never Heard") also came from the same session.

Critical reception 
The song received generally positive reviews from music critics. Brendan Klinkenberg of Rolling Stone said, "[the song] opens like most Drake songs, with gloomy, atmospheric synths and Drake singing sweetly to an ex-lover. Then Jackson comes in; even with some digital quivering added to his vocals, he's unmistakeable. While the "featuring Michael Jackson" billing would feel like an unnecessary flourish in almost any scenario, it's close to earned here." Larry Fitzmaurice of Entertainment Weekly thought "[the song] makes great melodic hay out of a headline-grabbing posthumous Michael Jackson feature." Roisin O'Connor of The Independent deemed it "hauntingly beautiful", however, she felt Jackson's voice "is controversially auto-tuned to the point that it sounds more like one of his biggest imitators, The Weeknd." NMEs Luke Morgan Britton described the song as "a clear-cut power move, rather than artistic posthumous collaboration," and considered it as an example of "cases of Drake doing things because he can, rather than because he should." The Hollywood Reporters Jonny Coleman felt the song "is as unsettling as a Tupac hologram, but ultimately not as offensive. It sounds like a Weeknd B-side but is weird enough to break up some of the exhaustion of listening to [Scorpion] in one sitting." Dean Van Nguyen of The Irish Times said, "Jackson's segment is lovely, his vocal loop floating over the warm ‘n’ woozy orchestration which comes off as a kind of downbeat version of "Liberian Girl". Unfortunately, Drake is the worst thing about the song, his depressed coos sounding formless and without conviction."

Commercial performance 
In the United Kingdom, "Don't Matter to Me" debuted at number two on the UK Singles Chart on the chart dated July 12, 2018, behind George Ezra's "Shotgun". It serves as Drake's 15th top-ten song and Michael Jackson's 44th top ten on the chart.

In the United States, the song debuted at number nine on the US Billboard Hot 100, making it Drake's 31st top-ten song and Jackson's 30th top ten on the chart. It stands as Jackson's second posthumous top-ten entry, tying the peak of his duet with Justin Timberlake, "Love Never Felt So Good" (2014).

Personnel
Credits adapted from the album's liner notes and Tidal.
 Noel Cadastre – recording
 40 – production, recording
 Noel "Gadget" Campbell – mixing
 Harley Arsenault – mixing assistance
 Greg Moffet – mixing assistance
 Ronald Moonoo – mixing assistance
 Michael Jackson – vocals
 Nineteen85 – production

Charts

Weekly charts

Year-end charts

Certifications

Release history

References

2018 songs
2018 singles
Drake (musician) songs
Michael Jackson songs
Song recordings produced by Nineteen85
Songs written by Drake (musician)
Songs written by Michael Jackson
Songs written by Paul Anka
Number-one singles in Greece
Number-one singles in Sweden
Male vocal duets
Songs released posthumously
Songs written by Negin Djafari
Young Money Entertainment singles
Cash Money Records singles
Republic Records singles